Carl Miller (August 9, 1894 – January 20, 1979), was an American film actor. He appeared in 48 films between 1917 and 1942 and remains perhaps best known for his roles in two Charlie Chaplin films, The Kid (1921) and A Woman of Paris (1923). He was born in Wichita County, Texas, and died in Honolulu, Hawaii.

Selected filmography
 The Doctor and the Woman (1918)
 The Kid (1921) 
 Cinderella of the Hills (1921)
 Condemned (1923)
 A Woman of Paris (1923)
 Jealous Husbands (1923)
 The Lover of Camille (1924)
 The Redeeming Sin (1925)
 The Red Kimona (1925)
 The Wall Street Whiz (1925)
 The Great K & A Train Robbery (1926)
 Raggedy Rose (1926)
 The Power of the Weak (1926)
 Whispering Sage (1927)
 Why Sailors Go Wrong (1928)
 Making the Varsity (1928)
 Traveling Husbands (1931)
 Honor of the Family (1931)
 Renegades of the West (1932)
 No Ransom (1934)
 The Plainsman (1936, uncredited)
 Lawless Valley (1938, uncredited)
 In Old California (1942, uncredited)

External links

1890s births
1979 deaths
American male film actors
20th-century American male actors
Male actors from Texas
People from Wichita County, Texas